Đà Nẵng Hospital is the largest hospital in the city of Đà Nẵng, Vietnam. It was established prior to 1945 as the Hôpital de Danang.

References

Hospitals in Vietnam
Buildings and structures in Da Nang